Pollex spastica is a moth of the family Erebidae first described by Michael Fibiger in 2007. It is known from Panay in the Philippines.

The wingspan is about 9 mm. The forewing is narrow and grey brown, suffused with black scales. The hindwing is unicolorous brown with an indistinct black discal spot and the underside unicolorous brown.

References

Micronoctuini
Taxa named by Michael Fibiger
Moths described in 2007